Etnachta (Hebrew: , with variant English spellings) is one of the most common cantillation marks in the Torah and Haftarah. It is the anchor for the Etnachta group, which in full consists of four different trope sounds, not all of which are always present. These are Mercha, Tipcha, Munach, and its namesake Etnachta. 

The Etnachta group marks the end of the first segment of a verse. Therefore, it never occurs more than once in a single verse.

An example is in the first verse of the Book of Genesis, the statement that God created is marked with an Etnachta, showing the completion of God’s creation.

The Hebrew word אֶתְנַחְתָּא translates into English as pause. This name is given because of its central location within a verse.

The Etnachta group
The following variations of the Etnachta group can occur:
Mercha, Tipcha, Munach, Etnachta
Mercha, Tipcha, Etnachta
Tipcha, Munach, Etnachta
Tipcha, Etnachta
Munach, Etnachta
Etnachta

In other words, the Tipcha can occur without a Mercha, but not vice versa. The Etnachta can occur without Munach, but not vice versa. And the Etnachta can occur without a Tipcha, but not vice versa.

The Munach is normally included when the word bearing the Munach is closely related to the word bearing the Etnachta.

Total occurrences

Melody

References

Cantillation marks